El Abuelo is a 2017 Peruvian-Colombian road comedy-drama film written and directed by Gustavo Saavedra Calle in his directorial debut. It stars Colombian Carlos Julio Vega along with the Peruvian actors Sebastian Rubio, Javier Valdés and Rómulo Assereto.

Synopsis 
The Grandpa is about to turn 80. His son and grandsons begin a journey to his homeland, Huamachuco, a place he has not seen since he was 9 years old. Along the way they discover an unexpected past and the journey will become a path of no return.

Cast 
The actors participating in this film are:

 Carlos Julio Vega as Crisóstomo
 Sebastian Rubio as José María
 Javier Valdés as Alfonso
 Rómulo Assereto as Santiago
 Patricia Portocarrero as María Elena
 Irene Iyzaguirre as Francisca
 Gabriela Velásquez as Lucrecia
 Graciela Paola as Paola María
 Franklin Dávalos as Carlos

Financing 
The film won the 2012 Fiction Feature Film Project Production Contest, Feature Film Production Award from the Ministry of Culture of Peru and obtained the Ibermedia Fund in 2013 to shoot the film.

Release 
The film premiered in August 2017 at the 21st Lima Film Festival. The film was commercially released on July 19, 2018 in Peruvian theaters and on July 27, 2018 by Señal Colombia in Colombia.

References

External links 

 

2017 films
2017 comedy-drama films
Peruvian road comedy-drama films
Colombian road movies
Colombian comedy-drama films
2010s road comedy-drama films
2010s Spanish-language films
2010s Peruvian films
Films set in Peru
Films shot in Peru
Films about old age
Films about families

2017 directorial debut films
2010s Colombian films